Robert Carter Nicholas (January 10, 1787 – December 24, 1856) was a United States senator from Louisiana.  He was a veteran of the War of 1812, and also served as Secretary of State of Louisiana and Louisiana's Superintendent of Education.

Early life and education
Born in Hanover, Virginia, on January 10, 1787, he was the son of Revolutionary war veteran and politician George Nicholas (1754–1799) and his wife Mary (Smith) Nicholas (d. 1806). and the grandson of Robert Carter Nicholas (1728–1780)., and named for his late grandfather Robert Carter Nicholas, Sr.
In 1816 and 1817 Nicholas attended the College of William and Mary in Williamsburg, Virginia.

Military service

Nicholas joined the United States Army in 1808, receiving a commission as a Captain in the 7th Infantry Regiment.
Nicholas was promoted to major in 3rd Infantry Regiment in 1810 and became Lieutenant Colonel of the 1st Infantry Regiment in 1812.  He served with his regiment in the War of 1812, including combat at the Battle of Chippewa.  After serving with the 30th Infantry, in 1814 he was promoted to colonel, and he commanded the 8th Infantry Regiment until resigning his commission in 1819.

Career
After his military service, Nicholas relocated to Kentucky, and in 1821 received an appointment as U.S. Indian Agent to the Chickasaw Nation.

Nicholas later moved to Louisiana, where he owned a sugarcane plantation in Terrebonne Parish while residing in St. James Parish. He operated that plantation using enslaved labor. In the last federal census in his lifetime, Nicholas owned 236 enslaved people.

Nicholas was elected as a Jacksonian (later a Democrat) to the U.S. Senate to fill the vacancy caused by the resignation of Senator-elect Charles E.A. Gayarre, and served from January 13, 1836, to March 3, 1841.

He was Secretary of State of Louisiana in 1845.  From 1849 to 1853 he was Louisiana's Superintendent of Education.

Death and legacy

Nicholas died in Terrebonne Parish on December 24, 1856.  He was originally buried at his plantation, and later moved to the Burthe family vault at Saint Louis Cemetery No. 1, New Orleans.

Personal life

He married Susan Adelaide Vinson, and their children included a daughter, Mary.  Mary Nicholas was the wife of Frederick George Burthe.

Nicholas was a nephew of John Nicholas, a U.S. Representative from Virginia and Wilson Cary Nicholas, a Senator from Virginia.

References

External links

1787 births
1856 deaths
People from Hanover County, Virginia
People from St. James Parish, Louisiana
United States Army colonels
United States Army personnel of the War of 1812
Democratic Party United States senators from Louisiana
Secretaries of State of Louisiana
Louisiana State Superintendents of Education
Robert Carter Nicholas 2
American planters
College of William & Mary alumni
Louisiana Jacksonians
Louisiana Democrats
Burials in Louisiana
Educators from Louisiana